Üüs Söl'ring Lön' (Söl'ring North Frisian for "Our Sylter Land" or more loosely "Our Homeland Sylt") is the insular anthem of Sylt. The lyrics were written by C. P. Christiansen (1855–1922). It is sung annually at the Biikebrennen.

Lyrics

See also
Leew Eilun Feer

References

North Frisian language
Regional songs
Sylt
European anthems
German anthems